Andrew Rutherford may refer to:

 Andrew Rutherford, 1st Earl of Teviot (died 1664), mercenary and Scottish peer
 Andrew Rutherford (English scholar) (1929–1998), Regius Professor of English Literature at the University of Aberdeen and Warden of Goldsmiths College, University of London
 Andrew Rutherford (pastoralist) ( 1809–1894), Australian pastoralist and politician
 Andrew Rutherford (politician) (1842–1918), New Zealand sheep breeder and politician
 Andrew Rutherford (rector) (fl. 1840s), rector of the University of Glasgow
 Andrew Rutherford (lutenist) (born 195?), American lutenist and luthier
 Andrew Rutherford (swimmer) (born 1972), Hong Kong swimmer

See also
 Drew Rutherford (1953–2005), footballer
Andrew Rutherfurd (disambiguation)